The 2002 All-Ireland Senior Hurling Championship Final was the 115th All-Ireland Hurling Final and the culmination of the 2002 All-Ireland Senior Hurling Championship, a tournament for the top hurling counties. The match was held at Croke Park, Dublin, on 8 September 2002, between Kilkenny and Clare. Kilkenny won on a score line of 2–20 to 0–19. The winning captain for Kilkenny was Andy Comerford.

Match details

Summary
D. J. Carey got the opening score, a goal in the third-minute goal, touching into the net after a Henry Shefflin run and lob into the square. Kilkenny were 1–2 to 0–0 up after six minutes of play.

References

External links
Match Highlights

All-Ireland Senior Hurling Championship Final
All-Ireland Senior Hurling Championship Final, 2002
All-Ireland Senior Hurling Championship Final
All-Ireland Senior Hurling Championship Finals
Clare county hurling team matches
Kilkenny county hurling team matches